is a Japanese football (soccer) club based in the city of Nara, capital of Nara Prefecture. They currently play in J3 League, the third tier professional in the Japanese football league system.

History 
The club was originally established in Nara in 1991 under the name  and it became a member of the Football Association of Nara. The club went up to the top division in 1997.  

It was renamed to its current name in 2008, and was promoted to the regional league in 2009. In 2014, they won the Regional League promotion series, earning promotion to the Japan Football League, where they played from 2015 to 2022.

On 5 November 2022, Nara was promoted to the J3 League for the first time in their history, after beating Veertien Mie in a narrow 1–0 win, with Sotaro Yamamoto scoring the winning goal in the 86th minute, to confirm their early access to the J3, a few rounds before the end of the season. The Nara-based club was promoted after eight consecutive seasons in the JFL. 15 days later at the same month, Nara secured their first JFL title, after drawing 1–1 with Sony Sendai at the last round of the competition. A ten-goal difference in Nara's favor them and FC Osaka was the determining factor that gave Nara the league title.

Stadium 
Nara Club currently plays its home matches at the Rohto Field Nara. The stadium is confirmed to host every Nara Club home match at the 2023 J3 League, after its schedule was revealed on 20 January 2023.

League and cup record 

Key

Honours 
 Nara Prefecture League
 Division 1
2001, 2004, 2006
 Division 2
1996
 Division 3
1995
 Division 4
1994
 Division 5
1993

Kansai League Division 2
 2009
Kansai League Division 1
2011, 2014

Japan Football League
2022

Current squad 
.

Club staff 
For the 2023 season.

Managerial history

Kit evolution

References

External links 

 

 
Football clubs in Japan
Association football clubs established in 1991
Sport in Nara Prefecture
1991 establishments in Japan
Japan Football League clubs
J.League clubs
Nara, Nara